Tahir Nikšić (born 12 June 1950) is a Bosnian actor and theatre artist. He started acting at the National Theatre Mostar, after which he went to Sarajevo where he graduated from the Philosophy College, department of acting, in 1975. In 1974 he began working at the Sarajevo National Theatre. He played in a number of drama serials and television films and performed in over 100 theatre performances. He served as a Sarajevo National Theatre manager in 2000.

References

1950 births
Living people
Actors from Mostar
Bosniaks of Bosnia and Herzegovina